The 1991 DFB-Supercup was the fifth edition of the DFB-Supercup. Uniquely, because Germany had just been reunified, the competition featured four teams instead of the usual two: The previous season's Bundesliga and DFB-Pokal winners, 1. FC Kaiserslautern and Werder Bremen, respectively, were joined by their counterparts from the East. Hansa Rostock had won both the NOFV-Oberliga and the NOFV-Pokal, so the losing cup finalists, Stahl Eisenhüttenstadt, took the fourth place in the competition.

Both Western teams advanced to the final, with Kaiserslautern defeating Werder Bremen 3–1 in the final in Hanover.

Qualified teams
The winners of the league and cup competitions of West and East Germany qualified for the tournament.

Bracket

Semi-finals

League champions

Cup winners

Final

Top goalscorers

See also
 1990–91 Bundesliga
 1990–91 NOFV-Oberliga
 1990–91 DFB-Pokal
 1990–91 NOFV-Pokal
 Deutschland-Cup (football)
 East Germany–West Germany football rivalry

Notes

References

1991
Supercup

de:Liste der DFB-/DFL-Supercup-Spiele#DFB-Supercup 1991